Thomas Heaton Gallon (November 28, 1886 – September 28, 1945) was a Texas native who went to Canada as a young man, where he became a track and field athlete and competed in the 1912 Summer Olympics.

In 1912 he was eliminated in the first round of the 400 metres competition.  He was also a member of the Canadian relay team which was eliminated in the first round of the 4x400 metre relay event.

Later, he became a captain in World War I with the First Division, 16th Battalion, and then had a career with the Royal Bank of Canada, working in that capacity at Havana.  In later years, he was president of the Sugar Sales Corporation.

References

External links
profile

1886 births
1945 deaths
American emigrants to Canada
Canadian male sprinters
Olympic track and field athletes of Canada
Athletes (track and field) at the 1912 Summer Olympics
Canadian Expeditionary Force officers
Canadian bankers
Canadian expatriates in Cuba
Track and field athletes from Texas